Atta/Ata (Punjabi: ਅਟਾ ; Bengali: আটা, romanized: Āṭā) or chakki atta is a wholemeal wheat flour, originating from the Indian subcontinent, used to make flatbreads such as chapati, roti, naan, paratha and puri. It is the most widespread flour in the Indian subcontinent.

Properties
Whole common wheat (Triticum aestivum) is generally used  to make atta; it has high gluten content, which provides elasticity, so dough made out of atta flour is strong and can be rolled into thin sheets.
 

The word ‘whole’ is used to describe atta as it includes every component of the grain, meaning the bran, germ and the endosperm. 

Atta was traditionally ground in the home on a stone chakki mill. This is useful when using a tandoor, where the flatbread is stuck to the inside of the oven, and also makes chapatis softer as the dough absorbs more water.

Gallery

See also
Maida flour

References

Further reading
 

Flour
South Asian cuisine
Indo-Caribbean cuisine